Zor Ka Jhatka: Total Wipeout is an Indian reality game show. Aired on Imagine TV, it was the Indian version of the American reality show Wipeout on ABC. It was hosted by Bollywood star Shah Rukh Khan and co-hosted by Saumya Tandon. The show consisted of a series of obstacles which the contestants must clear to move on to the next round. If a contestant fails to complete an obstacle, he is said to be wiped out. It was organized at the Wipeout course in Buenos Aires, while the end-game bits were shot with Khan at the Yash Raj Studios in Mumbai. The show started airing on 1 February 2011 at 9:00 pm and ended on 25 February 2011 with Kushal Punjabi as the winner taking home Rs. 5,000,000, while German-Polish model Claudia Ciesla was the runners-up by 51 seconds. Later this show was re-aired on Dangal TV.

Show format
The show is based on a series of challenges in large pools of water or mud to win  5 million. The episode winner gets Rs. 10 lacs and direct entry in the Grand Finale, the cost decreases after every two episodes. The winner was Kushal Punjabi, who defeated Claudia in the final by 51 seconds and walked away with a prize money of Rs. 5 million.

Contestants
 Capt Albert Louis
 Akashdeep Saigal
 Amit Sarin
 Amit Sareen
 Ashima Bhalla
 Bakhtiyaar Irani
 Claudia Ciesla
 Debina Bonnerjee
 Dimpy Ganguly
 Gaurav Chopra
 Gracious D’Costa
 Hanif Hilal
 Jennifer Winget
 Karan Wahi
 Karishma Tanna
 Krushna Patil
 Kushal Punjabi
 Manas Katyal
 Mohit Sehgal
 Manoj Kumar
 Mink Brar
 Narayani Shastri
 Natasha Suri
 Ravi Dixit
 Jai Bhagwan
 Payal Rohatgi
 Priyadarshini Singh
 Raja Chaudhary
 Simran Kaur Mundi
 Sonika Kaliraman
 Annie Gill
 Vindu Dara Singh
 Vrajesh Hirjee
 Priyanka Shah
 Dharamveer Singh
 Johanan Newnes

Finalists
 Capt Albert Louis
 Dharamveer Singh
Raja Chaudhary
 Ravi Dixit
Jai Bhagwan
Manoj Kumar
Bakhtiyaar Irani
Claudia Ciesla
Amit Sareen
 Krushna Patil
Kushal Punjabi
Simran Kaur Mundi
Annie Gill
 Hanif Hilal
Vindu Dara Singh

Grand Finalists
 Capt Albert Louis 
Jai Bhagwan
Claudia Ciesla
Kushal Punjabi

Winner
Kushal Punjabi

Guests
Priyanka Chopra
Abhishek Bachchan
Tusshar Kapoor
Shreyas Talpade
Kangana Ranaut
Riteish Deshmukh
Rani Mukerji

First episode
A total of 14 contestants participated in the first episode. They faced a series of challenges. Manoj Kumar won the episode completing Wipeout Zone challenge in 5 minutes and 27 seconds. Manoj Kumar won Rs. 10 lakh and got a direct entry in the grand finale episode. Capt Albert Louis, former Army Commando won the 15th Episode and won 3 Lakh and got the final ticket to Grand Finale. So did Claudia Ciesla and Kushal Punjabi. The rest of the contestants were Wiped Out.

References

External links
Official page

Indian game shows
Wipeout (Endemol TV series)
2011 Indian television series debuts
2011 Indian television series endings
Indian television series based on American television series